Sidny Feitosa dos Santos (born 21 July 1981 in Xique-Xique) is a former Brazilian footballer who last played for Salgueiro.

Biography

Pernambucano minor clubs
Born in Xique-Xique, Bahia, Sidny was signed by Vitória de Santo Antão in January 2005 until the end of 2005 Campeonato Pernambucano. In July 2005 he was signed by Serrano in 1-year deal. He played in the 2005 Campeonato Brasileiro Série C. In December 2005 he signed a 1-year deal with Salgueiro, also located in Pernambuco. Sidny was a player of the team in 2006 Campeonato Pernambucano.

Náutico & Livorno
Sidny was signed by Náutico in mid-2006, one of the major club in that state in temporary deal, where the team became his stepping stone. He finished as the third in 2006 Campeonato Brasileiro Série B and promoted to the top division of Brazil. In January 2007 the temporary deal between Náutico and Salgueiro was renewed as well as Sidny's contract with Salgueiro. In January 2008 Sidny was sold to Italian Serie A club Livorno. However he only able to play 2 games. In July 2008 Sidny returned to Brazil for Sport in 1-year temporary deal. In March 2009 Sidny terminated the contract and returned to Náutico until the end of 2009 Campeonato Brasileiro Série A. Náutico did not renew the contract as Sidny only played 10 league games for the club.

Brasiliense, Paysandu & Comercial
In February 2010 Sidny signed a 1-year deal with Brasiliense. Sidny only 3 games in 2010 Campeonato Brasileiro Série B. In December 2010 Sidny left for Paysandu, also in 1-year deal. Sidny played 12 games in 2011 Campeonato Brasileiro Série C, but the team failed to quality to the semi-finals.

In December 2011, Sidny signed a 6 months deal with Comercial de Ribeirão Preto.

In May 2012, Sidny joined Série B side ASA. However he was released on 12 June.

References

External links
 
 

Brazilian footballers
Serie A players
Salgueiro Atlético Clube players
Clube Náutico Capibaribe players
U.S. Livorno 1915 players
Sport Club do Recife players
Brasiliense Futebol Clube players
Paysandu Sport Club players
Comercial Futebol Clube (Ribeirão Preto) players
Agremiação Sportiva Arapiraquense players
Association football fullbacks
Brazilian expatriate footballers
Expatriate footballers in Italy
Brazilian expatriate sportspeople in Italy
Sportspeople from Bahia
1981 births
Living people